Hiroshi Miwa (born 2 September 1940) is a Japanese field hockey player. He competed in the men's tournament at the 1964 Summer Olympics.

References

External links
 

1940 births
Living people
Japanese male field hockey players
Olympic field hockey players of Japan
Field hockey players at the 1964 Summer Olympics
Place of birth missing (living people)
20th-century Japanese people